Zambia competed at the 1984 Summer Olympics in Los Angeles, United States.  The nation won its first ever Olympic medal at these Games.

Medalists

Athletics

Men
Track & road events

Field events

Boxing

Men

Judo

Men

References
Official Olympic Reports
International Olympic Committee results database

Nations at the 1984 Summer Olympics
1984
Oly